This is a list of mosques in Jerusalem.

Jerusalem, considered the holiest city for Christians and Jews, was one of the earliest cities conquered by the Muslim Arabs. The Dome of the Rock is the oldest preserved Islamic structure in the world. Today the city still contains several mosques, including the Al-Aqsa mosque which served as the first qibla for about a year.

Period

Rashidun (632–661)
Al-Aqsa Mosque - For the mosque known as the Mosque of Omar, see under "Ayyubids".

Umayyads (661–750)
Marwani Mosque is also known as the Musallah al-Marwani, it is located in the underground area in the south-eastern corner of al-Aqsa compound.

Ayyubids (1171–1341)
Mosque of Omar
Al-Khanqah al-Salahiyya Mosque is also known as the Khilwah (retreat) of Salah al-Din it was commissioned by the Ayyubid Sultan Saladin. Its only minaret is identical to that of Masjid Omar located south of the Holy Sepulchre. It is located north of the Church of the Holy Sepulchre.
Sheikh Jarah Mosque - It was established as a Zawiyyah, Zawiyyah al-Jarrahiyya, a mosque-madrassah (educational institute) by Hussam al-Din al-Jarrahi. It is located in east Jerusalem on Nablus Road.
Mosque of Al-Qala'a is situated within the Jerusalem Citadel, it was established during the Memluk era, and later on renovated several times. It is not a functional mosque and has been converted in to a Museum.
Magharba Mosque is located in the south-western corner it has been converted into a museum, recently.
Al Dissi mosque

Mamluks (1250–1517)
Sidna Omar Mosque (Lord Omar), mosque in the Jewish Quarter of the Old City
Sheikh Loulou Mosque (Sultan Emir Badr al-Din Loulou) is a small mosque located in the north-western part of the old city of Jerusalem.
Mosque of Khan al-Sultan (Sultan Barquq)

Ottomans (1516–1918)
al-Maulawiya Mosque is an older mosque transformed by the Crusaders into the Church of St Agnes and turned back into a mosque after their defeat
 Masjid Swiqat 'Allun is a small mosque situated in Swaikit 'Allun market, close to Bab al-Khalil (Jaffa Gate).

Modern (1918-present)

 Abdeen Mosque (Arabic: مسجد عابدين) is the main mosque in the Wadi al-Joz neighborhood in East Jerusalem, about 500 meters (1,600 ft) away from Al-Aqsa Mosque and the Old City walls. It was built by brothers Abdel Muhsin and Omar Abdeen in 1939.

Unknown
Shorbaje mosque was originally established as a Sebil Waqf (charitable fountain) for water dispensation, it was later on decommissioned with its original function when the city started to get its water from the city water mains. A small mosque was established on the premises.
Mosque of David the Prophet
Red Minerat mosque, also known as the Masjid Sheikh Rehan, is located on Hazariyah Ha'adom Street.
Mosque of Dome of Moses
Mosque of Bab Hattah
Mosque of Suleyman's throne
Mosque of Bab Al-Ghawanma
Mosque of Dar al-Imam
Mosque of Khan Al-Zeit
Mosque of Suleyman al-Farsi
Mosque of Raba'a Al-Adaweya
Mosque of Al-Tur
Mosque of Al-Hanablah
Nebi Akasha Mosque also referred to as the Nebi Okasha Mosque is a small and historic mosque in the Western Jerusalem. It is believed to have been built close to the tomb of Prophet Muhammad's companion Ukasha ibn Mihsan.
Khaldeya mosque
Yacoubiya mosque
Al-Buraq Mosque is located along the Western Wall of Haram al-Sharif (Temple Mount). It is the interior space of the so-called Barclay's Gate. The date of its conscription is unknown.
Al-Qormee Mosque
Al-Karemi mosque
Mosque of Al-Elmi
Haret el-Arman mosque
Haret el-Nasari Mosque
Bazar mosque
Masoudi mosque
Hejazi mosque
Mathana mosque
Afghani mosque

Gallery of Mosques in Jerusalem

References

External links
Most distinctive Sites in AL-Quds
Complete compendium of Mosques in Jerusalem on Madain Project website

List|Mosques
Jerusalem
Mosques
Mosques
Mosques
Israel religion-related lists